Schlesneria is a genus of bacteria from the family of Planctomycetaceae with one known species (Schlesneria paludicola). Schlesneria paludicola has been isolated from sphagnum peat from Bakchar in Russia.

References

Bacteria genera
Monotypic bacteria genera
Planctomycetota